Foxtrot (legally FTD-Retail, LLC) is a Ukrainian chain of electronics and home appliances stores.

Foxtrot's revenue in 2018 amounted to UAH 12.2 billion, and net profit was UAH 84 million. At the end of 2018, the Foxtrot network took the sixth place among Ukrainian retail chains and 76th place in the rating of the largest Ukrainian companies.

Since 2010 Foxtrot is the only Ukrainian member of Euronics — an international association of independent electrical retailers.

Founders of the company: Hennadiy Vykhodtsev and Valerii Makovetskyi.

In 2020 Foxtrot became one of the top 25 most successful Ukrainian brands.

References

External links

Retail companies of Ukraine
Ukrainian companies established in 1994